Ghoksadanga railway station is a railway station on the Barauni–Guwahati line of Northeast Frontier Railway. It serves Ghoksadanga town in Cooch Behar district in the Indian state of West Bengal. Its station code is GDX. The station consists of two platforms and four tracks with one FOB.

Trains 
Important trains like Sealdah -New Alipurduar Teesta Torsha Express, New Jalpaiguri - Bongaigaon Express etc are available from this station.
A number of trains connect to Ghoksadanga railway station. Live status of arrivals and departures on this station can be checked on Indian Railways website.

References

External links
 Ghoksadanga station on OpenStreetMap
 Ghoksadanga in pictures - Official website of Indian Railways

Railway stations in Cooch Behar district
Alipurduar railway division